Pierre Ducasse may refer to:

 Pierre Ducasse (footballer) (born 1987), French footballer
 Pierre Ducasse (politician) (born 1972), Canadian politician